Homer Eugene Asa Dick (March 22, 1884 in Three Mile Bay, Jefferson County, New York – January 22, 1942 in Rochester, Monroe County, New York) was an American lawyer and politician from New York.

Life
He was the son of Charles H. Dick (1858–1942) and Ida P. (Maine) Dick (1861–1919).

Dick was a member of the New York State Senate (46th D.) from 1922 to 1928, sitting in the 145th, 146th, 147th, 148th, 149th, 150th and 151st New York State Legislatures.

He died on January 22, 1942, in Rochester, New York, from his injuries after having been hit by a car on the previous evening; and was buried at the Brookside Cemetery in Watertown.

Sources

External links
 
 Photo of his father's blacksmith shop in Around Three Mile Bay by Elaine T. Bock ("Images of America" series; Arcadia Publishing, 2008; pg. 11)

1884 births
1942 deaths
Republican Party New York (state) state senators
Politicians from Rochester, New York
People from Jefferson County, New York
Road incident deaths in New York (state)
20th-century American politicians
Lawyers from Rochester, New York
20th-century American lawyers
Pedestrian road incident deaths